Mohamed Lamine Dansoko (born 15 March 1998) is a Guinean male sprinter, specializing in the 100 metres. He represented his nation Guinea at the 2016 Summer Olympics in Rio de Janeiro, and also achieved a personal best of 10.93 seconds in his signature race at the 2015 All-Africa Games in Brazzaville, Republic of the Congo.

At the 2016 Summer Olympics, Dansoko competed for the Guinean squad in the men's 100 metres. There, he ran the first of three heats against seven other sprinters with a sixth-place time of 11.05 seconds, failing to progress from the preliminary round.

References

External links

1998 births
Living people
Guinean male sprinters
Sportspeople from Conakry
World Athletics Championships athletes for Guinea
Athletes (track and field) at the 2016 Summer Olympics
Olympic athletes of Guinea